Zeniffe Fowler (born 8 November 1987) is a Jamaican cricketer. He played in one first-class match for the Jamaican cricket team in 2013.

See also
 List of Jamaican representative cricketers

References

External links
 

1987 births
Living people
Jamaican cricketers
Jamaica cricketers
Cricketers from Kingston, Jamaica